John C. Jacob (1936 – 11 October 2008) was one of the pioneers of the environmental movement in Kerala, India.

Biography 

John Jacob was born at Nattakam in Kottayam.

He earned a degree in zoology from Madras Christian College, after which he joined the faculty at St. Joseph's College, Devagiri in Kozhikode.  Eventually he headed up the Zoology Department at Payyanur College, where he worked until he retired in 1992.

At Payyanur, in 1972 he started a zoology club that would form the genesis of campus-based nature conservation activities.  The club also became involved in protesting threats to the environment.  Jacobs also started a few "green" magazines stressing the need to preserve nature.  He also set up the Society for Environment Education, Kerala (SEEK), which published an environment-focused magazine Soochimukhi. Additionally, Jacob led the movement against the Silent Valley project in South Kerala.

He is the author of several books, including Prakrithi: Nireekshanavum Vyakhyanavum and Urangunnavarude Thazhvaraka.

In recognition of his contributions to the environment, he was awarded the Kerala Biodiversity Board's Haritham Award and the state government's Vana Mithra Award.

The name of the plant Impatiens johnsiana  is dedicated Prof. John C. Jacob who was popularly known as ‘Johnsi’, an ardent naturalist who had devoted his life to conserve the biodiversity of the Western Ghats. The new plant is endemic to these parts of Western Ghats on densely clothed tree trunks in evergreen forests at an altitude of 1500-700 MSL. The observations showed that there are less than five hundred mature individuals restricted to a 10 km2 vested forest area. Impatiens johnsiana falls under the category Critically Endangered-CR (IUCN 2001). The research team included Dr M. K. Ratheesh Narayanan (now with Payyannur College Kannur; Dr C. N. Sunil (Sree Narayana Mangalm College, Moothakunnam Ernakulam); Dr N. Anil Kumar, Jayesh P. Joseph (MSSRF, Wayanad) and Dr T. Shaju (Tropical Botanic Garden and Research Institute, Thiruvananathapuram).

1936 births
2008 deaths
Indian environmentalists
People from Kottayam district
Activists from Kerala
Indian non-fiction environmental writers
Writers from Kerala
20th-century Indian non-fiction writers
Malayalam-language writers